Johnny Williamson (16 October 1895 – 1979) was a Scottish professional footballer who played as a wing half.

References

1895 births
1979 deaths
Scottish footballers
Association football wing halves
Armadale F.C. players
Preston North End F.C. players
Grimsby Town F.C. players
Lancaster City F.C. players
Darwen F.C. players
Morecambe F.C. players
English Football League players
FA Cup Final players
People from Fauldhouse
Footballers from West Lothian